Martin Raguž (born 2 March 1958) is a Bosnian Croat politician who served as the Chairman of the Council of Ministers of Bosnia and Herzegovina from 18 October 2000 until 21 February 2001. He was a member of both the national House of Representatives and House of Peoples.

Raguž also served as the first Minister of Human Rights and Refugees and as the Federal Minister without portfolio as well.

The war in Bosnia and Herzegovina
Raguž became politically active at the time of 1990 general election, the first an autonomous Bosnia and Herzegovina since the aftermath of World War I. He was one of the founders of the liberal-oriented BiH Union of Socialist Youth. He ran for Croatian member position of the Presidency of Socialist Republic of Bosnia and Herzegovina as a candidate SSO-H party. Of the seven Croatian candidates, Raguž finished last with a haul of 130,428 (6.13%) votes.

At the beginning of the Bosnian War in 1992, Raguž was appointed Minister of Labour and Social Policy for the Republic of Bosnia and Herzegovina, working in besieged Sarajevo. At the beginning of Croat–Bosniak War, he joined the HDZ BiH and accepted an invitation by the Croatian Republic of Herzeg-Bosnia to help mitigate the humanitarian crisis.

He worked as the deputy head of the Office for Displaced Persons, Refugees and Displaced Persons until 1993, when he was appointed head of that office replacing Darinka Tadić in this position. He remained in this position until 1994, when it became the Ministry for Refugees and Social Affairs, where he worked as deputy minister until the end of the war in 1995.

After the war
After the war, Raguž was appointed minister without portfolio, where he remained until 1996, and was in charge of coordinating activities for the implementation of Dayton Agreement. Between 1997 and 1998, he worked for the Croatian member of the Presidency, Krešimir Zubak. From 2000 till 2001, he served as the Minister of Human Rights and Refugees .

Following the general elections in October 2000. Raguž was appointed Chairman of the Council of Ministers on 18 October 2000. He served in this capacity until 22 August 2001, when he was replaced by Božidar Matić, a member of the Social Democratic Party. Raguž was then appointed Chairman of the Coordination Council.

After the High Representative Wolfgang Petritsch removed Ante Jelavić as the Croatian member of the presidency, talk began about possible successors to Jelavić as president of the HDZ BiH. The international community, as a condition of returning to political home-rule, required the removal of all politicians who participated in the creation of self-government. Although Raguž was part of a project of the self-government, the international community considered him to be acceptable as the new leader of the HDZ BiH.

HDZ 1990

The April package
After the schism within the HDZ BiH, Raguž was one of the founders of the HDZ 1990 led by Božo Ljubić. The schism occurred at the time of promoting the constitutional changes under the April Package (:hr:Travanjski paket), to which Ljubic objected, arguing that the package reduced the status of Croatian people in the nation to the level of a national minority. During this period, Raguž was a member of the Constitutional-Legal Committee of the House of Representatives.

Of the nine members of the committee, four supported the package, which was insufficient to forward the debate to the House of Representatives. Two board members were strongly opposed to the April Package, and the US Embassy, the High Representative and other representatives of the international community attempted to influence Raguž and two other board members, Beriz Belkić and  Filip Andrić, towards supporting the package. The committee decided to adopt the draft package for a hearing before House of Representatives on 18 April 2006. Some opponents tried but failed to insert amendments to their parties' platforms, but Raguž, under pressure from the US Embassy, did not support amendments from HDZ 1990 in the debate.

Efforts for the unification of the HDZ BiH
Croatian Prime Minister Ivo Sanader visited Mostar in March 2009, announcing the "inevitability" of unification of the HDZ BiH and HDZ 1990. Raguž has since become a leading promoter of the unification of the two parties. However, Raguž's political ambitions distanced him from his party colleagues. In April, the Presidency of HDZ 1990 adopted a platform for unification with the HDZ BiH providing equal representation in government. However, HDZ BiH President Dragan Čović rejected the possibility of unification in early May, compounded by HDZ 1990 officials being at risk of losing their positions in the event of reunification.

Party president
In March 2014 Raguž called for federation of Bosnia and Herzegovina. His call was welcomed by former High Representative Christian Schwarz-Schilling. Raguž, in a meeting with the director of the Department of South and Central Europe, the US State Department Jonathan Moore, he advocated for greater impact of the United States on Bosnia and Hercegovinu.

In December 2015, the West Herzegovina Canton HDZ 1990 board requested that Raguž resign because of "the general inactivity and inaction of the party and the party's deteriorating situation on the ground." He resign on 23 December 2015, citing health problems, including spinal issues.

2014 Presidential Campaign
Raguž accepted the nomination of the HDZ 1990 for the Croat member of the Presidency of Bosnia and Herzegovina on 5 July. His nomination marked a deepening of the conflict within the Croatian National Assembly. As the cornerstone of its policy was cooperation with the European Union. Previously, the candidate for the Croatian member of the Presidency announced as Živko Budimir, President of the Federation of Bosnia and Herzegovina.

Raguž's campaign received support from the First Bosnian parties, whose president Šeherzada Delić announced official support for Raguž in the election.

References

External links

Martin Raguž at imovinapoliticara.cin.ba

1958 births
Living people
People from Stolac
Croats of Bosnia and Herzegovina
Human rights ministers of Bosnia and Herzegovina
Politicians of the Croatian Republic of Herceg-Bosna